Hans Wunderlich (18 June 1899 - 26 December 1977) was a German journalist and politician of the SDP.

He was born in Munich and died at Osnabrück.

1899 births
1977 deaths
Politicians from Munich
Social Democratic Party of Germany politicians
German male journalists
Journalists from Munich
German newspaper editors